William George Nunn (born 27 February 1932) is a former Australian politician. He was a Member of the Queensland Legislative Assembly.

Early life 
Nunn was born during the Great Depression in Maryborough, the son of Robert Nunn whose ancestors arrived in Maryborough on the ship Great Queensland in 1874. His mother Eileen Marie Murphy who was descended from Irish settlers. He worked as a business manager.

Politics 
Nunn served as a Hervey Bay Councillor from 1987 to 1990.

In 1989, Nunn moved to state politics and was elected to the Queensland Legislative Assembly as the Labor member for Isis. After Isis was abolished before the 1992 election Nunn transferred to the new seat of Hervey Bay. Nunn served as a backbencher until his defeat in 1998 by One Nation candidate, David Dalgleish.

References

1932 births
Living people
Members of the Queensland Legislative Assembly
People from Maryborough, Queensland
Queensland local councillors
Australian Labor Party members of the Parliament of Queensland